The Amnesty International UK Media Awards 2012 were opened in December 2012, the short-list was published 25 April 2012 and the awards announced 29 May 2012.

In total there were 12 awards made in the categories of Digital Media, Documentary, The Gaby Rado Memorial Award, International TV and Radio, Magazine (Consumer), Magazine (Newspaper Supplement), National Newspaper, Nations and Regions, Photojournalism, Radio, Student Human Rights Reporter Award and TV News.

The awards ceremony was hosted by Dermot Murnaghan.

2012 Awards
The winners and runners up were:

See also

References

External links
 Amnesty International UK (AIUK) website 
 Amnesty International UK Media Awards at the AIUK Website
 Amnesty International Website

Amnesty International
British journalism awards
Human rights awards
2012 awards in the United Kingdom